The Virgin Islands are an archipelago in the Caribbean Sea. The islands fall into three different political jurisdictions:

 British Virgin Islands, a British overseas territory,
 United States Virgin Islands, an unincorporated territory of the United States,
 Spanish Virgin Islands, the easternmost islands of the Commonwealth of Puerto Rico, itself an unincorporated territory of the United States.

This list includes all tropical cyclones that have struck one or all of the above territories. For the period that reasonably reliable records exist, tropical storms strike the Territory on average approximately once every 8 years, although that includes strikes which only affected the northernmost (and lightly populated) island of Anegada.

In the 20th century, the Virgin Islands experienced 13 hurricanes, but they came largely in two clusters.  The Territory experienced five hurricanes from 1916 to 1932 (inclusive), and then only one during the next 57 years.  But then between 1989 and 1999 (inclusive) seven hurricanes struck the Territory (including six in the space of four years from 1995–1999). That was then followed by another 11-year hiatus without any hurricane strikes.

Twice in recent times the territories have experienced a rapid double-strike: in 1995 Hurricane Luis was followed nine days later by Hurricane Marilyn, and in 2017 Hurricane Irma was followed 14 days later by Hurricane Maria.

Footnotes

 
Virgin Islands